Ryńsk  ( (1902–1919), Rynsk, older spelling Rinsk) is a village in the administrative district of Gmina Wąbrzeźno, within Wąbrzeźno County, Kuyavian-Pomeranian Voivodeship, in north-central Poland.

The village has a population of 750.

In 1655, it was the site of the Treaty of Rinsk, a short-lived inner-Prussian alliance during the Second Northern War.

References

Villages in Wąbrzeźno County